Annika Marks is an American actress, writer and producer. She had a supporting role in 2012 film The Sessions, and played leading roles in independent movies Grace. (2014) and Anguish (2015). From 2014 to 2018 she played Monte Porter on Freeform drama series The Fosters.

Early life
She was born in Malmö, Sweden while her father was attending graduate school there but raised mainly in Bellevue, Washington. She attended Bellevue High School and studied dance at Cornish College of the Arts and acting at Seattle Children's Theatre.

Career
Marks started off her career in 2001 in the short-film G Spots?.  In 2002 she had a guest starring role on Law & Order: Criminal Intent. In 2003 she had a small role in Mona Lisa Smile. In 2004, Marks starred in the independent drama, The Undeserved. She is perhaps best known for her role in the 2012 drama The Sessions alongside Helen Hunt, William H. Macy and John Hawkes. The film received wide critical acclaim. In 2014, Marks had the lead role in the indie film Grace. and in 2015 starred in the psychological drama Anguish.

On television, Marks has the recurring role as Monte Porter in the Freeform (formerly ABC Family) drama series, The Fosters. She also guest-starred on Southland, NCIS: New Orleans, Battle Creek, Flaked, and The Affair.

In 2015, she starred in the one-woman play All American Girl, by Wendy Graf. She will co-direct the short film The Games We Play with Rich Newey, which will be her first time directing. In 2016 she starred in The Model Apartment, by Donald Margulies at the Geffen Playhouse 

She filmed the independent feature The Last Champion in early 2017.

She played Bernadette Davis on The Last Tycoon and  Kathy Schroeder in the miniseries Waco.

Personal life
She resides in Los Angeles. She is married to director Rich Newey.

Filmography

Film

Television

References

External links

AnnikaMarks.com - unofficial website

Living people
1986 births
American women screenwriters
American film actresses
American stage actresses
American television actresses
21st-century American actresses
Actresses from Washington (state)
People from Bellevue, Washington
American women film directors
English-language film directors
American women film producers
Film directors from Washington (state)
Screenwriters from Washington (state)
Film producers from Washington (state)